Patrik Sjöland (born 13 May 1971) is a Swedish professional golfer.

Early life
Sjöland was born in Borås.

Professional career
He turned professional in 1990 and after several season on the second tier Challenge Tour, graduated to the European Tour for the start of the 1996 season. His most successful year by far was 1998, when he finished 5th on the European Tour Order of Merit and featured in the top 50 of the Official World Golf Rankings. After a poor 2005 season, during which he slipped outside the top 100 on the Order of Merit and lost his European Tour card, he took a break from the tour, playing just two tournaments in 2006.

Sjöland secured a return to the European Tour at the end of season qualifying school season in 2006. He was unable to regain his early career form during 2007 and returned to qualifying school at the end of the year where he again regained his card, helped by a holed 7 iron for eagle during the final round. Having again missed out on retaining his card again in 2008, he was not able to repeat the trick and would have limited opportunities in 2009.

Sjöland has won twice on the European Tour, the first title coming in the 1998 Italian Open and the second in the 2000 Irish Open. He has won several other tournaments around the world, including the 1999 Hong Kong Open.

Professional wins (7)

European Tour wins (2)

*Note: The 1998 Italian Open was shortened to 54 holes due to rain.

European Tour playoff record (0–1)

Asian Tour wins (1)

Challenge Tour wins (1)

Nordic Golf League wins (2)

Other wins (1)
2005 Madrid Federation Championship (Peugeot Tour, Spain)

Results in major championships

CUT = missed the half-way cut
"T" = tied

Results in World Golf Championships

1Cancelled due to 9/11

QF, R16, R32, R64 = Round in which player lost in match play
NT = No tournament

Team appearances
Alfred Dunhill Cup (representing Sweden): 1996, 1998, 1999, 2000
World Cup (representing Sweden): 1996, 1998, 1999

See also
2006 European Tour Qualifying School graduates
2007 European Tour Qualifying School graduates
2009 European Tour Qualifying School graduates
2013 European Tour Qualifying School graduates

References

External links

Profile on golfdata.se 

Swedish male golfers
European Tour golfers
Sportspeople from Västra Götaland County
People from Borås
People from Gislaved Municipality
1971 births
Living people